Salvia hupehensis is a perennial plant that is native to Hubei province in China.

Notes

hupehensis
Flora of China